The following lists events that happened during 1863 in Chile.

Incumbents
President of Chile: José Joaquín Pérez

Events

December
8 December - Church of the Company Fire

Births
27 June - Fred Dennett (d. 1928)
3 August - Francisco Nef (d. 1931)
13 October - Joaquín Figueroa (d. 1929)

Deaths

References 

 
1860s in Chile
Chile
Chile
Years of the 19th century in Chile